The Labour Party is a political party in Indonesia founded on 5 October 2021. The party was reformed from and is a continuation of the defunct 1998 Labour Party founded by Muchtar Pakpahan. The party formed after the 4th Labour Party congress on 4-5 October in Jakarta.

The party has espoused a somewhat stronger left-wing foundation compared to the original Labour Party and is described as "pro-labourer and pro-worker". Despite that, Chairman Said Iqbal has not made clear if the party really follows left-wing politics, despite citing social democracy as the party ideology. To add much further confusion, Said Iqbal himself was also formerly a right-wing activist and politician from the Prosperous Justice Party. Such an unclear position has also raised confusion amongst Indonesian political experts about the party's alignment and commitment to labourist politics.

History 
In the aftermath of the passage of the Omnibus Law on Job Creation (Law No. 11/2020) by the People's Representative Council, many Indonesian labour unions felt disillusioned with the new law, which they deemed threatening to the labourers' and workers' rights and protections that they enjoyed prior to its passage. During the 4th Congress of the Labour Party, Said Iqbal, Chairman of the KSPI and sole candidate to be Chairman of the Labour Party, said that the passage of the law was a defeat for Indonesian labour unions. He realized that pressure tactics through using labour unions and mass organizations as pressure groups against government, general strike tactics, and employment of political demonstrations in Indonesia omnibus law protests were useless to stop the passage of the law. Due to this, he now seeks a democratic way to take down the law, by advancing pro-labour union and pro-worker politicians to join parliament.

At the Congress, Said Iqbal was elected Chairman of the Labour Party. The party is currently seeking a way to participate in the 2024 Indonesian general election.

Founding organisations 
The 2021 Labour Party was formed through the merging of the Labour Party and 10 other founding organizations:

 1998 Labour Party (political arm of Confederation of All Indonesia Laborers Unions, Indonesian: Konfederasi Serikat Buruh Seluruh Indonesia, KSBSI)
 Confederation of Indonesian Prosperous Laborers Unions (Indonesian: Konfederasi Serikat Buruh Sejahtera Indonesia, KSBSI)
 Confederation of Indonesian Workers Unions (Indonesian: Konfederasi Serikat Pekerja Indonesia, KSPI)
 Federation of Indonesian Metal Workers Unions (Indonesian: Federasi Serikat Pekerja Metal Indonesia, FSPMI)
 Indonesian Farmer Union (Indonesian: Serikat Petani Indonesia, SPI)
 Indonesian People Organization (Indonesian: Organisasi Rakyat Indonesia)
 Confederation of Indonesian Labour Union(Indonesian: Konfederasi Persatuan Buruh Indonesia, KPBI)
 Federation of Chemical, Energy, and Mining Labour Unions (Indonesian: Federasi Serikat Pekerja Kimia Energi Pertambangan, FSP KEP)
 Federation of Pharmacy and Health Labour Unions-Reformation (Indonesian: Federasi Serikat Pekerja Farmasi dan Kesehatan Reformasi, FSP Farkes-R)
 Indonesian Forum of Private Educators and Honorary Employees (Indonesian: Forum Pendidik dan Tenaga Honorer Swasta Indonesia, FTPHSI)
 Indonesian Women Movement (Indonesian: Gerakan Perempuan Indonesia)

Beyond these founding 11 organizations, more than 50 Indonesian Labour unions also expressed their support for the party, according to Said Iqbal.

Main program 
The party program proposes the following changes:

 Repeal of the Law No. 11/2020.
 Long-term pro-laborer and pro-worker rights struggle and activism.
 Formation of pro-laborer and pro-worker laws, including:
 More subsidy programs to people.
 Prohibition of outsourcing.
 Putting an end to the current Indonesian employing contracting system with unlimited renewal.
 Pushing laws providing adequate severance pay.
 Humane working hours.
 Protection of wages.
 Undoing/repealing laws granting corporation for simplified worker layoffs.
 Advocacy of putting menstrual and birthing leave into the laws.
 Formation of pro-farmer laws, including:
 Greater farmer rights and exclusivity
 Agrarian reform.
 Food sovereignty.

Responses 
Both parties from the ruling and opposition side of the current Joko Widodo administration congratulated members on the formation of the party, with the Great Indonesia Movement Party congratulating the party formation from the side of the ruling coalition and the Prosperous Justice Party congratulating the party formation from the opposition side. Many political experts see the party as having the potential to grow quickly to having a considerable grassroot basis amongst labourers, workers, farmers, fishermen, educators, and honorary employees. Despite that, experts also said that the new party has a challenge in consolidating all labour movements in Indonesia as their source of power, particularly because the current large parties in Indonesia also have their own affiliated labour unions and mass organizations which are much larger and more established compared to the new party. Additionally, labour movements in Indonesia are currently fragmented and lack strong figures to unite all laborers and workers. In the political history of Indonesia, there have been numerous labour-based parties formed since the Reformasi period but all the parties performed poorly and lacked strong figures, causing their impact to be negligible.

Not all labour unions welcomed the party. The oldest Indonesian labour union, the Confederation of All-Indonesian Worker Associations (Indonesian: Konfederasi Serikat Pekerja Seluruh Indonesia, KSPSI) did not respond well to the formation of the party and did not join the party. The leader of the KSPSI, Elly Rosita Silaban, explained that the conditions which labourist politics requires to grow are not met in Indonesia due to the lack of three things: (1) Low trade union density, despite the high number of labourers and workers. In Indonesia, according to the KSPSI's 2021 data, out of 127 million Indonesian labourers and workers, only 2.7 million are registered labourers and workers, and those 2.7 million labourers and workers are also scattered across one hundred specialized labour unions. (2) No single labour confederation as an umbrella organization to channel all labour and focus it to one point. (3) The number of parties in Indonesia which greatly scatters and dilutes the labourers' voice.

References

2021 establishments in Indonesia
Labour parties
Pancasila political parties
Political parties established in 2021
Political parties in Indonesia
Socialist parties in Indonesia